José Culí (1 June 1906 – 11 September 1971) was a Spanish athlete. He competed in the men's pole vault at the 1928 Summer Olympics.

References

External links
 

1906 births
1971 deaths
Athletes (track and field) at the 1928 Summer Olympics
Spanish male pole vaulters
Olympic athletes of Spain
Place of birth missing